Sporulenol synthase (sqhC (gene)) is an enzyme with systematic name tetraprenyl-β-curcumene—sporulenol cyclase. This enzyme catalyses the following chemical reaction

 sporulenol  tetraprenyl-β-curcumene + H2O

The reaction occurs in the reverse direction.

References

External links 
 

EC 4.2.1